Umbilical cord ulceration and intestinal atresia is a rare congenital disease that leads to intestinal atresia, umbilical cord ulceration and severe intrauterine haemorrhage. Only 15 cases have so far been reported, though newer studies are beginning to conclude that this disease has a higher incidence rate than has been previously reported. A particular study has given intestinal atresia and umbilical cord ulceration a clear link after 5 such cases were reported at the time of publication.

References

External links 

Rare diseases
Congenital disorders